Flueggea anatolica is a species of plant in the family Phyllanthaceae. It is endemic to Turkey.

References

anatolica
Endemic flora of Turkey
Critically endangered flora of Asia
Taxonomy articles created by Polbot
Plants described in 1993